Chulahoma is an unincorporated community in Marshall County, Mississippi, United States. It is located in the hill country of northern Mississippi.

Chulahoma is a name derived from the Chickasaw language meaning "red fox".

Culture
Blues singer and guitarist Junior Kimbrough (1930-1998) operated a juke joint in Chulahoma from c. 1992; following his death, Kimbrough's sons, musicians Kinney and David Malone Kimbrough, kept it open until it burned to the ground on April 6, 2000.

References

Unincorporated communities in Marshall County, Mississippi
Memphis metropolitan area
Unincorporated communities in Mississippi
Mississippi placenames of Native American origin